The Battle of Karakilisa ( Gharakilisayi chakatamart,  or ) was a battle of Caucasus Campaign of World War I that took place in the vicinity of Karakilisa (now Vanadzor), on May 25–28, 1918.

History
Although they were outnumbered, Armenian fighters managed to turn back the advancing Ottoman forces, breaking the armistice that had been signed with Transcaucasian commissariat in December 1917. The victory here as well as at Sardarabad and Abaran were instrumental in allowing the First Republic of Armenia to come into existence.

In several months, the cities of Erznka, Erzerum, Sarikamish, Kars and Alexandropol were invaded. On May 20, they invaded the Akhbulag, Djrajur and Kaltakhchi villages. On May 21, they invaded Vorontsovka. Pressed by the Turkish regular army, Armenian forces were retreating. One of the advancing Turkish forces moved towards Yerevan, another one to Karakilisa. The latter forces included about 10 thousand soldiers, 80 pieces of artillery and 50 machine-guns. The Armenians were leaving their homes moving to the south to Yerevan and Syunik. Garegin Nzhdeh (with his troops) reached Karakilisa and managed to unite the population for the fight. The Armenian forces reached the number of 6 thousand, with 80 pieces of artillery and 50 machine-guns. After a violent battle of 4 days, on May 25–28, both sides had serious losses. Although the Ottoman army managed to occupy Karakilisa and massacre all its population of 4,000 souls, it had no more forces to intrude farther into Armenian territories.

Wehib Pasha speaking to his headquarters,

References 

Karakilisa
Karakilisa
Karakilisa
Karakilisa
1918 in the Ottoman Empire
1918 in Armenia
May 1918 events